Johan Upmark is a World Champion Swedish bridge player.

Bridge accomplishments

Wins
 World Bridge Games Open Team (1) 2012
 World Team Olympiad (1) 2012

Runners-up
 Bermuda Bowl (1) 2016 
 European Team Championships (1) 2016

Personal life
Johan has a son, Oscar, born in 2018.

Notes

External links 
 
 
 

Swedish contract bridge players
Year of birth missing (living people)
Living people